During World War I, German prisoner-of-war camps were run by the 25 Army Corps Districts into which Germany was divided. Around 2.4 million men were World War I prisoners of war in Germany.

Types of camp 
Kriegsgefangenenlager (KGFL, "Prisoner of war camps") were divided into:
 Mannschaftslager ("Enlisted Men's Camp") for private soldiers and NCOs.
 Offizierslager ("Officer Camp") for commissioned officers.
 Internierungslager ("Internment Camp") for civilian enemy aliens.
 Lazarett, military hospital for POWs.

List of camps by Army Corps districts

Guards Corps (Berlin) 
Mannschaftslager
 Döberitz. A large camp  from Berlin holding Russian, Polish, French, and British prisoners, including men of the Royal Naval Division captured at the Siege of Antwerp.
 Dyrotz near Wustermark.
Lazarett
 Berlin. Located on Alexandrinenstrasse.

I Army Corps (Königsberg) 
None found.

II Army Corps (Stettin) 
Mannschaftslager
 Altdamm. Three camps holding 15,000 men.
 Schneidemühl. Located  from the town this was a centre for work camps in the region, holding 40,000–80,000 men.
 Stargard.
 Stettin.
 Stralsund.
Lazarett
 Thorn.

III Army Corps (Berlin) 

Mannschaftslager
 Brandenburg an der Havel. Camp for Naval and Merchant Marine personnel.
 Cottbus. A sub-camp of Merzdorf.
 Crossen an der Oder.
 Frankfurt an der Oder.  from the town, holding 18,000 men.
 Guben.  from the town.
 Merzdorf.
 Müncheberg.
 Spandau. Camp for POWs working at a chemical factory.
 Zossen. The POWs were subjected to propaganda urging them to revolt against their "colonial masters" with little result
Internierungslager
 Havelberg. For 4,500 internees of various nationalities, including nearly 400 British Indians

IV Army Corps (Magdeburg) 
Offizierlager
 Burg bei Magdeburg. Camp for 900 prisoners.
 Halle. Camp in a disused factory.
 Magdeburg. Camp on an island in the river.
 Torgau. Two camps in Bruckenkopf Barracks and in Fort Zinna.
Mannschaftslager
 Gardelegen. Camp opened in September 1914.
 Grabow. Formerly a military camp, consisting of eight compounds of six barracks each.
 Merseburg An assembly camp holding up to 25,000 prisoners, from which men were drafted to work camps.
 Quedlinburg. A camp  from the town, holding 12,000 men.
 Wittenberg. A camp  in area at Klein Wittenberg,  from the city. Eight compounds held 13,000 men.
 Zerbst. It held up to 15,000 men, but there were 100,000 registered there, the majority engaged in industry and agriculture.
Internierungslager

 Ruhleben. Camp for up to 4,500 internees  from Berlin located at a racecourse.

V Army Corps (Posen) 
Mannschaftslager
 Lauban.
 Sagan. A camp  from the town holding 6,000 men.
 Skalmierschütz. A very large camp for Russians and Romanians to which British and American prisoners were sent in early 1918.
 Sprottau A camp  from the town, and also a Lazarett for prisoners with tuberculosis.
 Stralkowo. A camp  from the town holding mainly Russians and Romanians, and British from March 1918.

VI Army Corps (Breslau) 
Offizierlager
 Gnadenfrei. Situated in a former boys school.
 Neisse. Located in former military academy in the centre of the town.
 Schweidnitz.
Mannschaftslager
 Lamsdorf. A camp at a military training ground that was reopened during World War II as Stalag VIII-B.
 Neuhammer. A clearing camp for Upper Silesia. 100,000 men were registered there, but were mostly in work camps under its administration.
Lazarett
 Beuthen. Two large Lazaretts, containing British prisoners from early 1918.

VII Army Corps (Münster) 
Offizierlager
 Gütersloh. Originally a sanatorium.
 Werl. Located in a Franciscan monastery.
 Wesel
Mannschaftslager
 Burg Steinfurt. A camp for British prisoners.
 Dortmund.
 Duisburg.
 Dülmen.
 Düsseldorf.
 Erfurt. Held 15,000 men.
 Friedrichsfeld. Camp holding 35,000 men.
 Hammerstein. A camp for Russian prisoners.
 Heilsberg
 Minden. A camp  from the town with 18,000 men.
 Münster. There were four camps: Münster I was outside the city in open farming country, Münster II was at the racecourse (Rennbahn), Münster III was a former Army barracks, and Münster IV was reserved for Russian prisoners.
 Sennelager. Three camps just north of Paderborn, named Senne I, II & III.
 Stendal.
 Tuchel. A camp for Russians and Romanians, also holding British and American prisoners from 1918.
Lazarett
 Paderborn.

VIII Army Corps (Coblenz) 
Offizierlager
 Crefeld. There was also a Lazarett there.

Mannschaftslager
 Limburg an der Lahn. A camp holding 12,000 men in which Irish prisoners were concentrated for the purpose of recruiting for the Irish Brigade.
 Meschede. The camp, just outside the town, held 10,000 POWs.
 Wahn. The camp had 35,000 men on its register, and was a parent camp for work camps in the district.
Lazarett
 Aachen. Nine hospitals for British POWs awaiting repatriation.
 Coblenz.
 Cologne. Several hospitals. British prisoners were treated either in the Garrison Lazarett I or the Kaiserin Augusta Schule Lazarett VI.
 Trier. Officer prisoners were treated in the Reserve Lazarett IV (Horn Kaserne).

IX Army Corps (Altona) 
Offizierlager
 Augustabad, Neubrandenburg. A former hotel holding British officers. Conrad O'Brien-ffrench was held there.
 Fürstenberg.
Mannschaftslager
 Güstrow. Situated in pine-woods  from the town. It held 25,000 men, with a further 25,000 assigned to work camps registered there.
 Lübeck. A camp for men employed at the docks. Also a reserve Lazarett.
 Neumünster
 Parchim. A camp built on a former cavalry drill ground  from the town. It held 25,000 men, with up to 45,000 more assigned to work camps registered there.
Lazarett
 Bremen. A garrison hospital and also a work camp attached to Soltau.
 Hamburg Reserve Lazarett VII was a ward of the central prison at Fuhlsbüttel. Reserve Lazarett III was at the Eppendorfer Krankenhaus, and at Veddel there was a Lazarett for Navy personnel.

X Army Corps (Hannover) 

Offizierlager
 Bad Blenhorst near Nienburg
 Celle. At Scheuen, and until late 1916 also Reserve Lazarett I (St Joseph).
 Clausthal.
 Hesepe nr. Osnabrück.
 Holzminden. For 500–600 British officers (plus approximately 100–160 other ranks orderlies). Housed in a former cavalry barracks (built 1913). The site of a noted tunnel escape in July 1918.
 Osnabrück. Camp located in a former artillery barracks.
 Ströhen.
 Schwarmstedt.
 Wahmbeck. At a hotel holding mostly officers from the merchant service.
Mannschaftslager
 Göttingen.
 Hameln. Located  from Hameln, and the parent camp of many work camps.
 Munster. Camp opened in 1914 near Soltau on Lüneburg Heath
 Salzwedel.
 Soltau. The camp held 35,000 men, but had 50,000 assigned to work camps registered there.
Lazarett
 Hanover. Lazarett V was in the Royal War School, and there was another at the Garrison Lazarett.
Internierungslager

 Celle Castle. For civilians and ex-officers.
 Holzminden. For approximately 4,000–5,000 civilian internees, mainly Polish, Russian, French and Belgian, and including a small number of Britons. Comprised two camps, one for men, the other for women and children.

XI Army Corps (Cassel) 
Offizierlager
 Bad Colberg. Camp housed in a former sanatorium.
Mannschaftslager
 Langensalza. Opened in 1914, the camp held 10,000 men.
 Ohrdruf. Located on a former Army training ground and held 15,000 men.

XII Army Corps (Dresden) 
Offizierlager
 Bischofswerda.
 Königstein. French and Russians held in the Fortress.
Mannschaftslager
 Bautzen
 Königsbrück. Held 15,000 men.

XIII Army Corps (Stuttgart) 
Mannschaftslager
 Heilbronn Sub-camp of Stuttgart.
 Stuttgart. Two camps; one in the city in an abandoned factory building, the other in a disused factory  outside.
 Ludwigsburg.
Lazarett
 Kempten. British prisoners quartered in the hospital there.

XIV Army Corps (Karlsruhe) 
Offizierlager
 Karlsruhe. Two camps; one in the grounds of the Karlsruher Schloss contained naval and, later, aviation officers, the other, the former Europäischer Hof, was known as "The Listening Hotel", and was an interrogation centre.
 Freiburg. Located in an old university building.
 Heidelberg. In barracks  from town.
 Ingolstadt. The camps were located in the city fortifications; fortresses 8, 9 & 10. As a camp for persistent escapers, it was the World War I counterpart to Colditz. Documented in the book The Escaping Club by Alfred John Evans.
 Villingen. The camp was in a disused barracks.
 Weingarten near Karlsruhe.
Mannschaftslager
 Ingolstadt. Situated on the edge of the town, holding 4,000 men.
 Mannheim Located  outside of the city. From February 1917 it used as a clearing or exchange camp for British prisoners of war awaiting repatriation. Held 10,000 men.
Internierungslager
 Rastatt Camp for French civilians. During 1918 it was used as a military transit camp.

XV Army Corps (Strasbourg) 
Offizierlager
 Strasbourg

XVI Army Corps (Metz) 
 Metz. Known as Lazarett Saint-Clément.

XVII Army Corps (Danzig) 
Mannschaftslager
 Czersk. A camp for Russian POWs, to which British prisoners were also later sent.
 Danzig (Troyl) The "camp" consists of barges moored on the bank of the Vistula River, each containing from 100 to 500 men. The administration block, kitchen, and other facilities of the camp are on shore. Men from the failed Irish Brigade were sent here.

XVIII Army Corps (Frankfurt-am-Main) 
Offizierlager
 Bingen am Rhein
 Friedberg
 Griesheim nr. Frankfurt
 Mainz. The camp was in the grounds of the Mainz Citadel, and held 700 POWs.
 Rosenberg. Located in Festung Rosenberg above the town of Kronach. Charles de Gaulle was held as a POW there.
 Weilburg. POWs were held in a three-storied school-house.
Mannschaftslager
 Darmstadt Located  from the town on a cavalry exercise ground.
 Giessen
 Görlitz. Held 14,000 POWs.
Lazarett
 Jülich
 Kreuznach. For up to around 600 prisoner-patients.

XIX Army Corps (Leipzig) 
Offizierlager
 Döbeln
Mannschaftslager
 Chemnitz. The camp was located in the Friedrich-August Kaserne.
 Zwickau. The camp held 10,000 POWs.

XX Army Corps (Allenstein) 
Mannschaftslager
 Arys
 Osterode Located at a locomotive works. A sub-camp of Preußisch Holland.
 Preußisch Holland. The camp held 15,000 POWs, with up to 35,000 assigned to various work camps registered there.

XXI Army Corps (Saarbrücken) 
Offizierlager
 Neunkirchen. Located in a former monastery.
 Saarbrücken. In a former school.
 Saarlouis
 Zweibrücken. British officers were first sent there in 1916.

I Royal Bavarian Army Corps (Munich) 
Mannschaftslager
 Landsberg am Lech
 Lechfeld. Held 10,500 POWs.
 Puchheim. Located on a military airfield  from Munich. Held 12,000 POWs.
Lazarett
 Munich. The large war school in the Mars Platz is used as a hospital, and there is another known as Lazarett B.

II Royal Bavarian Army Corps (Würzburg) 
Offizierlager
 Würzburg. Located in Festung Marienberg.
Mannschaftslager
 Hammelburg
 Germersheim. Held 6,000 men.
 Würzburg. Outside the town on a high hill.

III Royal Bavarian Army Corps (Nürnberg) 
Mannschaftslager
 Amberg. Held 5,000 POWs.
 Bayreuth. Held 5,000 POWs.
 Landau
 Nuremberg. Located  from the town on an old training ground of the Nuremberg Garrison.
Lazarett
 Erlangen. For officers only.

Others 
Offizierlager
 Eutin
 Graudenz
 Lahr. British from 1917.
 Landshut
 Ludwigshafen. From 1917.
 Münden. Camp for up to 600 officers located in a former factory  from the town.
 Osnabrück
 Pforzheim. From early 1918.
 Strasbourg
Mannschaftslager
 Cassel (Niederzwehren). Held 20,000 POWs.
 Constance. All officers and men for internment in Switzerland are concentrated here. Held 15,000.
 Deutsch Gabel Camp for merchant seamen under Austrian administration.
 Grafenwöhr Camp and Lazarett (Bavarian Corps)
 Gleiwitz. Located in a cavalry barracks. British prisoners sent there after March 1918.
 Heustadt. A centre for work camps in East Prussia.
 Heuberg. Located at the training area Lager Heuberg.
 Kalisch. Camp for Russian and Romanian soldiers, and also British from April 1918.
 Kattowitz Camp for Russian and Romanian soldiers, and also British from April 1918.
 Marienburg A centre for work camps in East Prussia.
 Neuburg am Inn
 Ulm. Camp on the outskirts of the town, of the usual barrack type.
 Zittau Russian POWs.
Lazarett
 Frankfurt am Main. Several hospitals for British prisoners; Reserve Lazarett II and H65 are the principal ones.
 Ingolstadt. Two hospitals in the town.
 Ratisbon

Fictional prison camps
 Luft-Stalag 13 – in the TV series Hogan's Heroes
 Stalag 17 – in the 1953 film of that name
 Stalag Luft Nord – in the 1963 movie The Great Escape
 Dusterstadt – in The Young Indiana Jones Chronicles / The Adventures of Young Indiana Jones film episode "Chapter 8: Trenches of Hell"

See also
 German camps in occupied Poland during World War II
 Lists of World War II prisoner-of-war camps
 World War I prisoners of war in Germany

References
Notes

Bibliography
 

Germany
Pow